Anna's Retreat is a town in the administrative subdistrict of Tutu in St. Thomas, U.S. Virgin Islands. , the population was 7,600, making Anna's Retreat the second-largest town in the U.S. Virgin Islands after the territorial capital, Charlotte Amalie.

As with many parts of the territory, tourists are often present in the town and contribute to the local economy.

Education
The Joseph Gomez Elementary School and the Emanuel Benjamin Oliver Elementary school serve Anna's Retreat.

Geography
Anna's Retreat is located on the east side of Saint Thomas.

Climate
According to the Köppen Climate Classification system, Anna's Retreat has a tropical savanna climate, abbreviated "Am" on climate maps.

Shopping
Anna's Retreat is one of the biggest shopping districts in the U.S. Virgin Islands
and is also home to Tutu Park Mall.

Transportation
The Weymouth Rhymer Highway passes through Anna's Retreat, turning into Red Hook Rd which leads to Red Hook.

See also
 Charlotte Amalie West
 Cruz Bay

References

External links

Populated places in Saint Thomas, U.S. Virgin Islands
Towns in the United States Virgin Islands
Tutu, U.S. Virgin Islands